Crystal Palace may refer to:

Places

Canada
 Crystal Palace Complex (Dieppe), a former amusement park now a shopping complex in Dieppe, New Brunswick
 Crystal Palace Barracks, London, Ontario
 Crystal Palace (Montreal), an exhibition building
 Crystal Palace, Toronto, a former exhibit building at Exhibition Place

Germany
 Glaspalast (Munich), a German building resembling the British building
 Glaspalast Sindelfingen, an indoor sporting arena in Germany

United Kingdom
 The Crystal Palace, built in 1851 originally in Hyde Park, then relocated to south London in 1854 and destroyed by fire in 1936
 The Great Exhibition, the event the building was built for, sometimes also known as the Crystal Palace Exhibition
 Crystal Palace School, set up by the Crystal Palace Company in 1853
 Crystal Palace, London, a residential area within several boroughs in south London around the location of the former Crystal Palace building

 Crystal Palace Park, the grounds to which the Crystal Palace Exhibition building was relocated
Crystal Palace circuit, former motor racing track within the park
 Crystal Palace transmitting station, in the London Borough of Bromley
 Crystal Palace railway station, in the London Borough of Bromley
 Crystal Palace (High Level) railway station, a defunct station in the London Borough of Southwark

 Crystal Palace (ward), in the London Borough of Bromley

United States
 New York Crystal Palace, an 1853 exhibition building
 Buck Owens Crystal Palace night club, museum, and restaurant in Bakersfield, California
 Pythian Castle Lodge, Milwaukee, Wisconsin, also known as "Crystal Palace"
 Crystal Palace, former code name for Cheyenne Mountain Operations Center, a United States military base.

Other places
 Crystal Palace, a building in Petrópolis, Brazil
 Palacio de Cristal del Retiro, Madrid, Spain
 Crystal Palace (Ljubljana), a skyscraper in Slovenia
 Rokumeikan, a former pavilion in Tokyo, Japan, often called "Crystal Palace" in English

Sport
 Crystal Palace F.C., a professional football club based in Selhurst, London
 Crystal Palace F.C. (Women), a ladies football club based in south-east London 
 Crystal Palace F.C. (1861), a defunct amateur football club formed in 1861
 Crystal Palace Baltimore, previously Crystal Palace F.C. USA, a professional soccer team in Maryland, US
 Crystal Palace circuit, a former motor racing circuit in Crystal Palace Park
 Crystal Palace (basketball), a former British Basketball League team
 Crystal Palace National Sports Centre, the national sports centre and athletics stadium situated inside the Crystal Palace park

Fiction
 Crystal Palace, a space station in the online game Entropia Universe
 Crystal Palace, a place in the game Paper Mario
 The Crystal Palace (novel), by Phyllis Eisenstein

Other uses 
 Crystal Palace (horse), a racehorse

See also 
 Crystal Palace pneumatic railway, a 19th-century experimental railway
 1909 Crystal Palace Scout Rally, a Boy Scout rally held in 1909
 Crystal Cathedral, a church in Garden Grove, California, US
 Crystal Castles (disambiguation)
 Glass Palace (disambiguation)
 Glaspaleis, a former fashion house and department store in Heerlen, The Netherlands
 

es:Palacio de Cristal
pt:Palácio de Cristal